The 2015–16 Stetson Hatters men's basketball team represented Stetson University during the 2015–16 NCAA Division I men's basketball season. The Hatters, led by third year head coach Corey Williams, played their home games at the Edmunds Center and were members of the Atlantic Sun Conference.

Due to APR violations, Stetson was ineligible for the NCAA Tournament. Despite having a conference record of 4–10, seventh out of eighth place in the conference, and having no postseason berth to play for, the Hatters made an improbable run to the 2016 Atlantic Sun men's basketball tournament championship game. They came up just short, losing 80–78 in overtime on the road to Florida Gulf Coast to finish the season with a record of 12–22. If Stetson had won, North Florida would have received the conference's automatic NCAA Tournament bid as the regular season champion.

Roster

Schedule

 
|-
!colspan=9 style="background:#; color:#FFFFFF;"| Regular season

|-
!colspan=9 style="background:#; color:#FFFFFF;"| Atlantic Sun tournament

References

Stetson Hatters men's basketball seasons
Stetson
Stetson Hatters
Stetson Hatters